Civitas is the condition of Roman citizenship.

Civitas may also refer to:

Organisations
 CIVITAS (European Union), a European initiative to make urban transport more environmentally friendly
 Civitas Foundation for Civil Society, a Romanian non-governmental organisation which aims to stimulate  local and regional development
 Civitas Institute, a conservative American think-tank
 Civitas (think tank), a British think-tank
 Civitas (movement), a right-wing Roman Catholic pressure group in France

Schools
 Collegium Civitas, a college in Poland
 Baltimore Civitas Middle/High School, a school in Fairmount, Baltimore City

Creative works
 Civitas Londinum, the formal title of the 16th-century Woodcut map of London
 Sancta Civitas, a 20th-century oratorio by Ralph Vaughan Williams
 Civitas Dei, a book by St. Augustine

Places
 Civitas Tungrorum, a Roman administrative district now in Belgium
 Civitas Tropaensium, a Roman castrum now in Romania
 Civitas Equestrium, the original name of Nyon, Switzerland
 Civitas Bernanensium, the original name of Lescar, France
 Civitas Schinesghe, a medieval Latin name for Poland
 Civitas Silvanectium, the Latin name from various communities named Senlis in France

See also
 Civita (disambiguation)